Apeda Studio was a photography business in New York City. It was established as a partnership between Alexander W. Dreyfoos. It incorporated in 1914.

In 1913 Dreyfoos was sued unsuccessfully for copyright infringement, for reproducing the work of another studio, marking it as its own work, and selling it.

Its photo of Bert Errol in drag featured on a postcard. It published a photograph of minstrel performers in blackface.

Alexander W. Dreyfoos Jr. was the son of its co-founder.

The International Center of Photography (ICP) and Library of Congress have collections of photographs from the studio.

References

Photography companies of the United States
1914 establishments in New York City